Benjamin Burton (1709–1767) was an Irish politician.

Burton was born in Dublin and educated at Eton and Trinity College, Dublin.

Burton represented  Knocktopher from 1741 until 1760 and County Carlow from 1761 until his death. He was Commissioner of Revenue for Ireland and a Privy Councillor.

References

1709 births
Politicians from Dublin (city)
1767 deaths
People educated at Eton College
Irish MPs 1727–1760
Irish MPs 1761–1768
Members of the Parliament of Ireland (pre-1801) for County Kilkenny constituencies
Members of the Parliament of Ireland (pre-1801) for County Carlow constituencies
Alumni of Trinity College Dublin
Members of the Privy Council of Ireland